Epuni is a suburb of Lower Hutt, New Zealand situated in the south of the North Island of New Zealand. The suburb lies around one kilometre east of the Lower Hutt CBD.

The suburb takes its name from the Te Āti Awa chief Honiana Te Puni.

In 2018 HNZ, which in October 2019 became part of Kaingaora Ora Homes and Communities, announced that it was to build 153 homes on long-vacant land in Epuni where earlier HNZ houses had been demolished.

Demographics

Epuni had a population of 6,039 at the 2018 New Zealand census, an increase of 153 people (2.6%) since the 2013 census, and a decrease of 24 people (-0.4%) since the 2006 census. There were 2,262 households. There were 2,985 males and 3,051 females, giving a sex ratio of 0.98 males per female, with 1,149 people (19.0%) aged under 15 years, 1,155 (19.1%) aged 15 to 29, 2,853 (47.2%) aged 30 to 64, and 885 (14.7%) aged 65 or older.

Ethnicities were 63.4% European/Pākehā, 13.5% Māori, 8.2% Pacific peoples, 23.3% Asian, and 4.2% other ethnicities (totals add to more than 100% since people could identify with multiple ethnicities).

The proportion of people born overseas was 29.8%, compared with 27.1% nationally.

Although some people objected to giving their religion, 41.5% had no religion, 40.0% were Christian, 5.8% were Hindu, 2.1% were Muslim, 1.7% were Buddhist and 3.1% had other religions.

Of those at least 15 years old, 1,413 (28.9%) people had a bachelor or higher degree, and 801 (16.4%) people had no formal qualifications. The employment status of those at least 15 was that 2,424 (49.6%) people were employed full-time, 696 (14.2%) were part-time, and 240 (4.9%) were unemployed.

Education

External links

References

Suburbs of Lower Hutt